Baliochila latimarginata is a butterfly in the family Lycaenidae. It is found in Kenya and Tanzania. Its habitat consists of lowland forests ranging from near sea level to 800 metres in altitude.

Subspecies
Baliochila latimarginata latimarginata (coast of Kenya, Tanzania: from the north coast inland to Amani)
Baliochila latimarginata rondoensis Henning & Henning, 2004 (south-eastern Tanzania)

References

Butterflies described in 1933
Poritiinae